Deltophora angulella is a moth of the family Gelechiidae. It is found in Kenya.

The length of the forewings is about 7 mm. The forewings are grey-brown with dark brown markings. Adults have been recorded on wing from September to October.

References

Endemic moths of Kenya
Moths described in 1979
Deltophora
Moths of Africa
Taxa named by Klaus Sattler